State Highway 286 (SH 286) is a Texas state highway running from downtown Corpus Christi south to Chapman Ranch. The route was designated on its current route in 1939. Before 1939, this route was known as SH 96, and was proposed to be extended to the southwest to Riviera. It is also locally known as the "Crosstown Expressway."

History
The route from Corpus Christi to Chapman Ranch was originally designated as a portion of SH 96 as early as 1933. The highway was redesignated to SH 286 on September 26, 1939.

Throughout much of 2017, construction was done to expand the freeway south to FM 43. The work was completed by the end of the year.

Route description
The route of SH 286 runs from FM 70 northward to I-37 in Dollywood in Nueces County. The southern terminus is located in rural Nueces County at FM 70 south of Corpus Christi. The highway heads north with intersections at FM 2444 and FM 43 before turning to the northeast and crossing Oso Creek near Cabaniss Field Naval Air Station. SH 286 becomes a freeway south of SH 357 (Saratoga Boulevard). The freeway portion of the highway is known as the Crosstown Expressway.  As the freeway heads to the northeast, it has an interchange with SH 358 (South Padre Island Drive). The freeway continues to the northeast from the interchange through downtown Corpus Christi.

Junction list

References

286
Transportation in Corpus Christi, Texas
Transportation in Nueces County, Texas